The CONCACAF W Gold Cup is an upcoming international women's football competition contested by the senior women's national teams of the member associations of CONCACAF, the regional governing body of North America, Central America, and the Caribbean. It was announced in December 2020, initially unnamed though referred to as a "Women's CONCACAF Nations League". The branding was announced in August 2021, with CONCACAF describing the tournament as their "flagship women's international competition".

Adoption
On 10 December 2020, the CONCACAF Council approved the structure and calendar of a "Women's CONCACAF Nations League". However, the naming and branding of the tournament had yet to be determined. The competition is intended to provide more national team matches for all CONCACAF member associations. On 19 August 2021, it was announced that the competition would be known as the CONCACAF W Gold Cup, with the branding also revealed.

Format
The qualification competition, known as the "Road to CONCACAF W Gold Cup", will begin with the group stage, featuring 33 women's national teams of CONCACAF split into three leagues (A, B and C). Each league will feature three groups, containing three teams each in League A, and four teams each in Leagues B and C. The teams in each group will play against each other home-and-away in a round-robin format. The three group winners in League A will qualify directly for the W Gold Cup. The group runners-up of League A and the League B group winners will participate in a play-in to compete for the final three spots at the W Gold Cup. The two CONCACAF women's national teams that qualify for the Summer Olympics will receive a bye directly to the W Gold Cup, skipping the group stage.

The W Gold Cup will feature twelve teams, including the two teams that qualified for the Summer Olympics, the six teams that qualified from the group stage and play-in, and four guest national teams from other confederations. The twelve teams will be split into three groups of four, and will compete in a single round-robin. Eight teams, the top two teams of each group and the two-best third-placed teams, will advance to the knockout stage. The knockout stage will consist of quarter-finals, semi-finals and a final to determine the champion.

Invitees

Invitees nations record

See also
 CONCACAF Gold Cup
 CONCACAF Nations League
 CONCACAF W Championship

References

External links

 
Gold Cup
2020 establishments in North America
Recurring sporting events established in 2020